Johanna Maria "Hannie" Termeulen (18 February 1929 – 1 March 2001) was a freestyle swimmer from the Netherlands, who won three medals at the Summer Olympics. After having claimed the bronze medal in the women's 4 × 100 m freestyle relay in London in 1948, she won two silvers (100 m freestyle and 4 × 100 m freestyle relay) in Helsinki the same year. She also won three medals at the European championships of 1947 and 1950.

References

External links 

 

1929 births
2001 deaths
Swimmers at the 1948 Summer Olympics
Swimmers at the 1952 Summer Olympics
Olympic swimmers of the Netherlands
Olympic silver medalists for the Netherlands
Olympic bronze medalists for the Netherlands
Olympic bronze medalists in swimming
Medalists at the 1948 Summer Olympics
Medalists at the 1952 Summer Olympics
Dutch female freestyle swimmers
Sportspeople from Wiesbaden
European Aquatics Championships medalists in swimming
Olympic silver medalists in swimming
20th-century Dutch women